Montezuma is a former hamlet and township in Solano County, California, located in the California Delta region of the state; the township, which embraced the hamlet, and several other places, such as Bird's Landing—which still exists—included portions of the Montezuma Hills. The name Montezuma was used in multiple places within Solano County by Mormon settlers during the period from 1847 to 1850.

The hamlet was also a stop on the Oakland, Antioch and Eastern Railway (later absorbed into the Sacramento Northern Railway), an electrified interurban passenger rail line that ran, with the help of a ferry across Suisun Bay, from Oakland, through Contra Costa County, across the bay, and into Solano County, making stops at Chipps and Dutton, before passing through Montezuma on its way to Rio Vista, California. The railway stop was located approximately a mile and a half northwest of present-day Collinsville, just after the rail line swung due north, from its north-easterly trajectory from the ferry landing at Chipps Island, at the Suisun Bay shoreline.

References

External links
  (Flash file, probably difficult to view)
 
 

Unincorporated communities in California
Unincorporated communities in Solano County, California